Parajapygidae is a family of hexapods in the order Diplura.

Genera
 Ectasjapyx Silvestri, 1929
 Miojapyx Ewing, 1941
 Grassjapyx Silvestri, 1903
 Parajapyx Silvestri, 1903

References

Diplura
Arthropod families